Frank Thelen (born 10 October 1975) is a German businessman, investor and author based in Bonn.

Career 
Thelen was a co-founder of companies such as ip.labs and doo. As of 2014, he is the CEO of venture capital firm e42, now Freigeist Capital, which has invested in startups such as Wunderlist, MyTaxi, KaufDa, pitch, Lilium, Hardt Hyperloop and Endurosat.

Thelen consults the Microsoft Ventures accelerator in Berlin, and he also supports startups in German politics. Together with the German State Minister for Digitization, Dorothee Bär, he is a leading member of the German Innovation Council.

In 2012, Thelen spoke at the Founders Conference in New York and was given the "Innovate by Society" Award by Microsoft handed out by German Chancellor Angela Merkel that same year for his startup "doo".

Thelen is an advocate of some form of universal basic income (UBI). He supports startups in German politics. Europe is in danger of falling behind in economic competition with the U.S. and China, he said, and to change that, Europe needs to show more commitment and unity.

In 2014, he joined the German version of the TV show Dragons' Den (Shark Tank), called Die Höhle der Löwen, as investor. He is also a regular guest in German talk show Hart aber fair.

In 2018, his autobiography Startup-DNA – Hinfallen, aufstehen, die Welt verändern was published and has been a bestseller for several weeks. He is convinced that "The next decade will be the biggest challenge in humankind's history".

Awards 
In 2012, Thelen received the "Innovate 4 Society Award" from Microsoft for the startup "doo". The award was handed over by Angela Merkel.

Publications 
 Die Autobiografie: Startup-DNA – Hinfallen, aufstehen, die Welt verändern. Murmann Publishers. 2018. .
 Europa kann es besser: Wie unser Kontinent zu neuer Stärke findet. Ein Weckruf der Wirtschaft. Autorenbeitrag. Publisher: Thomas Sigmund & Sven Afhüppe. Herder, Freiburg 2019, .
 10xDNA: Das Mindset der Zukunft. Frank Thelen Media, .

External Links 
Homepage

Twitter Account

References 

1975 births
Living people
German chief executives
German company founders
20th-century German businesspeople
21st-century German businesspeople
German autobiographers
German investors
Universal basic income in Germany
Businesspeople from Bonn